Uhlerstown Historic District, also known as Uhlerstown Village and Rural Historic District, is a national historic district located in and around Uhlerstown, Bucks County, Pennsylvania.  The district includes 63 contributing buildings, 4 contributing sites, and 16 contributing structures along the Delaware Division of the Pennsylvania Canal centered on the village of Uhlerstown.  Notable buildings and structures include a covered bridge (1832), Michael Uhler house, a stone hotel, Redman's Hall, lock tender's house, a feed mill, a general store, Uhler's old store and post office, a boat building shop, lime kiln, and several mule barns.

It was added to the National Register of Historic Places in 1994.

References

Historic districts in Bucks County, Pennsylvania
Historic districts on the National Register of Historic Places in Pennsylvania
National Register of Historic Places in Bucks County, Pennsylvania